The University of Mons is a Belgian university located in the city of Mons, founded in 2009 by merging the Engineering Faculty of Mons (FPMs) and the University of Mons-Hainaut. The merging of the institutions was achieved following a geographical logic because of the high complementarity between them and their location in the same city.

This merger was accepted by the two universities on 6 July 2007 and confirmed by the Belgian French Community Parliament on 25 November 2008. From an administrative point of view the University of Mons was founded on 1 January 2009.

Prof. Calogero Conti, former rector of the Engineering Faculty of Mons, became the first rector of the University of Mons.

The University of Mons is the fourth (of six) university of the French community of Belgium with over 10,000 students.

Faculties 
Faculté Polytechnique de Mons (FPMs) - Faculty of Engineering
Faculty of Economics and  Management (Warocqué)
Faculty of Psychology and Education Sciences
Faculty of Medicine and Pharmacy
Faculty of Sciences
Faculty of Translation and  Interpretation (FTI-EII)
Faculty of Architecture and Town Planning (from 2010)

Institutes 
Institute for Social Sciences
Institute for Legal Sciences
Institute for Language Sciences

Research 
20 research fields (grouping several labs per research field)
4 research centres:
 Multitel (ICT)
 Materia Nova (Materials)
 Inisma (Ceramic materials)
 CETIC (ICT)
Dozens of Spin-offs, Start-ups, Patents ...

Education 
Several "International Master" programs (all courses in English) were set up in collaboration with the Université Libre de Bruxelles within the Brussels-Mons Institute of Engineering:
 TELEMDIA
The TELEMEDIA programme is designed for telecom and multimedia aficionados willing to gain skills and knowledge in those applied fields. The degree is definitely an asset in leading sectors such as: satellites, phone services, cable broadcasting and telephony, multimedia applications, computer networks, data security, mobile phone and internet telecommunication technology.  
 BIOSYS
BIOSYS is a specialized Master in Biosystems Engineering, focusing on methods and techniques for measurement, signal processing, system modelling, optimization and control with
applications in medical signal and image processing, as well as process applications in the bio-industry, including red, green and white biotechnology.
 MATERIALS SCIENCE - FROM DESIGN TO APPLICATIONS
The master's degree in Materials Science "From Design to Applications" aims at providing a multidisciplinary, research-oriented training in Materials Science. Note that this master benefits from a multidisciplinary collaboration between the Schools of Engineering and Faculties of Science. It also benefits from the participation of the Materia
Nova and INISMa research centres.

Academic Profiles

The university is included in major world university rankings, e.g. that of the Academic Ranking of World Universities, QS World University Rankings and U.S. News & World Report Best Global University Ranking.

Notable alumni
 Elio Di Rupo, chemist, politician, and former prime minister of Belgium.
 Soumia Fahd, Moroccan herpetologist
 Greta Tintin Eleonora Ernman Thunberg, activist

See also 
 Top Industrial Managers for Europe
 Science and technology in Wallonia
 University Foundation
 Initialis Science Park
 Science Parks of Wallonia

External links 
 University of Mons website
 The official discussion of the Belgian French Community Parliament of 25 November 2008 (in French)

References 

 
Mons
Educational institutions established in 2009
2009 establishments in Belgium
Buildings and structures in Hainaut (province)
Universities and colleges formed by merger in Belgium